Texarkana is a city in Bowie County, Texas, United States, in the Ark-La-Tex region. The Texas city's population was 36,193 at the 2020 census.

The city and its Arkansas counterpart form the core of the Texarkana Metropolitan Statistical Area, encompassing all of Bowie County, Texas, and Miller County, Arkansas. The two cities had a combined population of 65,580 in the 2020 decennial census, and the metropolitan area had a population of 149,482.

History

Railroads were quick to see the possibilities of connecting markets in this vast area. In the late 1850s, the builders of the Cairo and Fulton Railroad were pushing their line steadily south across Arkansas. By 1874, they crossed the Red River and reached the Texas state line. Between February 16 and March 19, 1874, trains ran between the Texas border and the Red River, whence passengers and freight were ferried north to Fulton, Arkansas to continue by rail. The Red River Bridge opened on March 20, 1874. Since then, trains have run directly from Texarkana to St. Louis, Missouri.

Keen rivalry existed between the 1870s railroad builders. The Texas and Pacific Railroad reached across Texas to the Arkansas state line. The border was the logical place for the different railways to connect. On December 8, 1873, the Texas and Pacific sold the first town lots for the future city. The first buyer was J. W. Davis, who purchased the land where today's Hotel McCartney now stands, opposite Union Station.

The name Texarkana is known to be a portmanteau of Texas, Arkansas, and nearby Louisiana. However, accounts of the name's origin differ, and it had been in use some time before the town was founded. The most popular tradition is that when the St. Louis, Iron Mountain and Southern Railway was building its line through the area, Col. Gus Knobel, a railroad surveyor, coined the name. He is said to have painted it on a plank and nailed it to a tree, saying "This is the name of a town which is to be built here." Another story tells of a Red River steamboat named The Texarkana, . A third account relates that a storekeeper named Swindle in Red Land, Louisiana, concocted a drink called "Texarkana Bitters".

20th century to present
Racial discrimination continued after the abolition of slavery in both states. Violent attacks and lynchings against black people took place, especially in the late 19th and early 20th centuries. Black people were largely disenfranchised throughout the South from the turn of the century until after passage of federal voting rights legislation in 1965 and enforcement. On May 22, 1922, Hullen Owens, an African-American man, was lynched by a large white mob made up of thousands of people.

In the late winter and spring of 1946, from February 22 to May 3, residents of the two cities were terrorized by violent attacks against four young couples. Five of the eight individuals were killed, in what were called the Texarkana Moonlight Murders. Law enforcement believed the attacks to be the work of a serial killer, but no one was ever prosecuted for these crimes. The attacks took place in both Texarkana, Arkansas, and the twin city area in Texas.

Geography

Texarkana is located at the junction of Interstate 30 and US highways 59, 67, 71, and 82 in extreme northeast Texas on the Texas-Arkansas border, at  (33.437170, –94.067394). It is bordered by the city of Texarkana, Arkansas, to the east, and by the smaller cities of Nash and Wake Village, Texas, to the west. It is in the Central Time Zone.

The city is roughly 180 miles northeast of Dallas.

Climate

 The warmest month is August.
 The highest recorded temperature was 112 °F (47 °C) on August 4–5, 2011.
 On average, the coolest month is January.
 The lowest recorded temperature was –6 °F (–21 °C) on December 22–23, 1989.
 The most precipitation on average occurs in December.
 A humid subtropical climate (Cfa) exists in the region.

On May 22, 2008, a microburst producing winds up to 100 mph occurred over Stateline Avenue and surrounding communities. An analysis of radar data leading up to the damage showed that two severe thunderstorms came together on the south side of the city. One severe storm was moving northeastward from southern Bowie County, while the other was moving northwestward through Miller County. Both storms collided in an area just south of downtown Texarkana.

Demographics

According to the 2020 United States census, there were 36,193 people, 14,148 households, and 8,767 families residing in the city. The 16,270 housing units averaged 589.4 per square mile (227.5/km). Of the 16,280 households, 31.5% had children under the age of 18 living with them, 42.5% were married couples living together, 19.3% had a female householder with no husband present. and 34.1% were not families; 29.9% of all households were made up of individuals, and 12.1% had someone living alone who was 65 years of age or older. The average household size was 2.42 and the average family size was 3.01.

In the city, the age distribution of the population was 26.0% under the age of 18, 10.0% from 18 to 24, 27.6% from 25 to 44, 20.7% from 45 to 64, and 15.7% who were 65 years of age or older. The median age was 36 years. For every 100 females, there were 89.0 males. For every 100 females age 18 and over, there were 84.4 males.

The median income for a household in the city was $29,727, and for a family was $39,119. Males had a median income of $34,155 versus $21,143 for females. The per capita income for the city was $17,815. About 19.4% of families and 24.0% of the population were below the poverty line, including 34.8% of those under age 18 and 13.2% of those age 65 or over.
The most affluent area of Texarkana is Pleasant Grove, where the median income is $49,562 for each household and the median for a family is $57,219 in 2013.

Economy
According to the city's 2009 Comprehensive Annual Financial Report, the top employers in the city are:

Government

Local government
According to the city's most recent Comprehensive Annual Financial Report Fund Financial Statements, the city's various funds had $36.0 million in revenues, $37.0 million in expenditures, $18.9 million in total assets, $3.5 million in total liabilities, and $7.2 million in investments.

Education

Public school districts
Schools in Texarkana, Texas, are under the jurisdiction of the Texarkana Independent School District, the Liberty-Eylau Independent, Pleasant Grove Independent School District, and  Red Lick Independent School District.

Colleges and universities
Texarkana is home to Texas A&M University–Texarkana, a four-year branch of the Texas A&M University System, and to Texarkana College, a community college.

Religion
Texarkana is the headquarters of the theologically conservative American Baptist Association, whose Missionary Baptist churches are most numerous in Texas, Arkansas, Louisiana, Oklahoma, and Mississippi.

State government
Though the city was historically Democratic, Texarkana is currently represented by Republicans in both houses of the Texas State Legislature. The state senator is Bryan Hughes from District 1. State Representative Gary VanDeaver represents Texas House District 1.

The Texas Department of Criminal Justice  operates the Texarkana District Parole Office in Texarkana.

The Texas Sixth Court of Appeals is located downtown in the Bi-State Justice Building.

Federal government
At the federal level, the two U.S. senators from Texas are Republicans John Cornyn and Ted Cruz; Texarkana is part of Texas's 4th congressional district, which is currently represented by Republican Pat Fallon.

The Federal Courthouse (which also holds the downtown post office) is located directly on the Arkansas-Texas state line and is the only federal office building to straddle a state line. During his campaign for the presidency, John F. Kennedy spoke on the steps of the courthouse September 13, 1960, and so did President Jimmy Carter, on October 22, 1980.

The Federal Correctional Institution, Texarkana, is a Federal Bureau of Prisons facility in unincorporated Bowie County just outside the southwest border of the city.

Transportation

Texarkana Regional Airport is located in Texarkana, Arkansas, and serves general aviation and American Eagle service to Dallas/Fort Worth International Airport.

Texarkana Union Station is located in downtown Texarkana along the state line, with Amtrak's Texas Eagle providing daily service east to Chicago and west to San Antonio, continuing on to Los Angeles three days a week, with intermediate points.

The Texarkana Urban Transit District provides bus transportation to major areas of town along nine different routes. Service runs from 5:30 am to 6:20 pm Monday–Saturday.

Interstate 30 passes through Texarkana on the north. Loop 151 on the west of the city forms part of the Texarkana Loop, a three-quarter loop around the west, south, and east of the twin cities with I-30 completing the loop on the north. Interstate 369 shares the western portion of Loop 151. Interstate 49 is a newly constructed interstate corridor on the Arkansas side of the city which connects Texarkana to Shreveport, Louisiana.

Downtown murals 
Across the Texarkana TX Arts & Historic District downtown, a colorful array of murals are for viewing. The murals have helped promote local talent and encouraged engagement from the community. Several murals have been used for social media and professional photos.

Notable people

 Joe Anderson, NFL wide receiver
 Miller Barber, golfer
 Jesse Belvin, singer, pianist, and songwriter
 Footsie Blair, (1900-1982) - was a Major League Baseball second baseman for the Chicago Cubs.
 J.B. Bobo, magician
 Ben M. Bogard, clergyman, founder of American Baptist Association in Texarkana in 1924
 Willie Buchanon, football player
 Melvin Bunch, baseball player
 David Crowder, musician
 Robert Ealey, electric blues singer
 Carl Finch, musician, founder of Brave Combo
 Corinne Griffith, silent-film actress
 Harmonica Slim, blues harmonicist, singer, and songwriter
 Rich Houston, football player
 V. E. Howard, clergyman who founded the International Gospel Hour and was the pastor of the Walnut Street Church of Christ in Texarkana
 LaMichael James, football player for the San Francisco 49ers and Miami Dolphins
 Brandon Jones, NFL wide receiver
 Parnelli Jones, race car driver in International Motorsports Hall of Fame
 Scott Joplin, ragtime music composer and pianist
 Jeff Keith, lead singer of rock band Tesla
 Jarrion Lawson, American sprinter and long jumper
 Joshua Logan, film and stage director, Tony Award and Pulitzer Prize winner
 Ryan Mallett, NFL quarterback for Baltimore Ravens
 Eddie Mathews, baseball player in Hall of Fame
 Will Middlebrooks, baseball player for the Milwaukee Brewers
 Craig Monroe, baseball player
 Mac Morgan, opera singer
 Dustin Moseley, baseball player
 Ross Perot, businessman and politician
 Charles B. Pierce, movie producer
 Molly Quinn, actress
 John D. Raffaelli, American lobbyist 
 James Theodore Richmond, writer, conservationist
 Bill Rogers, golfer
 Dame Marjorie Morris Scardino, Pulitzer Prize-winning publisher and CEO of Pearson PLC
 Michael Jarboe Sheehan, Roman Catholic Archbishop of Santa Fe
 Rod Smith, NFL player for Denver Broncos
 Drew Stubbs, baseball player for the Colorado Rockies
 Marshall Terrill, author
 Aysel Teymurzadeh, singer, performer
 Michael Trimble, opera singer, voice teacher
 Nathan Vasher, football player
 Michael Wacha, baseball player for the San Diego Padres  
 Frank D. White, governor of Arkansas from 1981 to 1983
 Otis Williams, musician, founding member of The Temptations

Notes

References

External links

 City of Texarkana, Texas portal
 Texarkana Chamber of Commerce
 Handbook of Texas Online: Texarkana, Texas
 Texarkana Gazette
 Texarkana Convention & Visitors Bureau 

 
.
Cities in Bowie County, Texas
Cities in Texarkana metropolitan area
Cities in the Ark-La-Tex
Texarkana, Texas
Twin cities
Cities in Texas